Daniel Patrick O'Shea (born June 15, 1945) is a Canadian former professional ice hockey centre.

Born  in Ajax, Ontario, O'Shea started his National Hockey League career with the Minnesota North Stars in 1968 after playing for the Canadian Olympic Hockey Team at the 1968 Winter Olympics where he won a bronze medal.  O'Shea would also play for the Chicago Black Hawks and St. Louis Blues of the NHL, and Minnesota Fighting Saints of the World Hockey Association. Danny is the brother of Kevin O'Shea.

Career statistics

Regular season and playoffs

International

External links
 

1945 births
Living people
Canadian ice hockey centres
Chicago Blackhawks players
Ice hockey people from Ontario
Ice hockey players at the 1968 Winter Olympics
Medalists at the 1968 Winter Olympics
Minnesota Fighting Saints players
Minnesota North Stars players
Olympic ice hockey players of Canada
Olympic bronze medalists for Canada
Olympic medalists in ice hockey
People from Ajax, Ontario
St. Louis Blues players